Douglas James Kershaw (born January 24, 1936) is an American fiddle player, singer and songwriter from Louisiana. Active since 1948, he began his career as part of the duo Rusty and Doug, along with his brother, Rusty Kershaw. He had an extensive solo career that included fifteen albums and singles that charted on the Hot Country Songs charts. He is also a member of the Louisiana Music Hall of Fame, being inducted in 2009.

Early life 
Born in an unincorporated community called Tiel Ridge in Cameron Parish, Kershaw spoke Louisiana French and did not learn English until the age of eight. By that time, he had mastered the fiddle, which he played from the age of five, and was on his way to teaching himself to play 28 instruments. His first gig was at a local bar, the Bucket of Blood, where he was accompanied by his mother on guitar.

Kershaw became interested in Cajun music during parties his parents would host on the family's houseboat in Louisiana, where he first heard Cajun bands playing the music.

"Doug and Rusty"
Doug grew up surrounded by Cajun fiddle and accordion music. After teaching his brother, Rusty, to play guitar, he formed a band, the Continental Playboys, with Rusty and older brother Nelson "Peewee" Kershaw in 1948. With the departure of Peewee from the group, in the early 1950s, Rusty & Doug continued to perform as a duo. In 1955, when Kershaw was nineteen, he and Rusty performed on the Louisiana Hayride KWKH radio broadcast in Shreveport, Louisiana. The two also performed at the WWVA Jamboree (later renamed Jamboree U.S.A.), in Wheeling, West Virginia.

Although the brothers initially sang in French, J. D. "Jay" Miller, owner of the Feature Records label, persuaded them to incorporate songs in English into their repertoire. In 1955, Doug and Rusty recorded their first single, "So Lovely, Baby." Released on the Hickory label, the tune went to number 14 on the country music charts. Later that same year, Doug and Rusty were invited to become members of the Louisiana Hayride cast. The Kershaws appeared at the Grand Ole Opry in Nashville, Tennessee and became regular members of the Opry cast the following year.
Despite the demands of his music career, Doug enrolled in McNeese State University, in Lake Charles, Louisiana, where he earned an undergraduate degree in Mathematics. At the peak of their early career, in 1958, Doug and Rusty both enlisted in the United States Army. They devoted their attention to the military until their discharge three years later.

"Louisiana Man" and solo career 
After fulfilling their military obligation, the two brothers recorded "Louisiana Man", an autobiographical song that Doug had written while in the Army. The song not only sold millions of copies but over the years has come to be considered a standard of modern Cajun music. The song was eventually covered by more than 800 artists.

There were three albums released by the duo on Hickory Records, only one being released before they split up. The first was Rusty and Doug Sing Louisiana Man (LPM 103) in 1961. Kershaw (Genus Cambarus) (LPS 163) was released in 1972 and was a double LP. Louisiana Man (HR 4506) was the final Hickory album, released in 1974. By 1964, the brothers had elected to go their separate ways. It took another three years before Kershaw signed a songwriters' contract with BMI, in 1967.

In June 1969, Kershaw made his first network television appearance on the debut of the Johnny Cash Show. After watching Kershaw's Johnny Cash Show performance as an eight-year-old boy, Mark O'Connor became inspired to learn to play the fiddle. He capped the year with a week-long engagement at the New York City's Fillmore East as opening act for Eric Clapton's Derek and the Dominos. While it seemed to many rock and pop fans that Kershaw had appeared out of nowhere, he had already sold more than 18 million copies of the records he had made in the early '60s with his brother, Rusty. "Louisiana Man" had been a Top 10 country hit in 1961 and its follow-up, "Diggy Liggy Lo", had done almost as well. His performance in front of a national audience led to Warner Bros. Records signing him to a long-term contract. In July 1969, he performed at the Newport folk festival along with Joni Mitchell, Arlo Guthrie, Ramblin Jack Elliott, Big Mama Thornton, and Mimi Fariña, among others. Newcomers that year were Don McLean, James Taylor, and Jerry Jeff Walker. In November 1969, "Louisiana Man"  was broadcast back to earth by the crew of the Apollo 12 moon mission. Beyond the southern venues, Kershaw became widely known in mainstream America as he played at major urban concert halls.

In 1970, Kershaw contributed a violin part to Arlo Guthrie's record single "Alice's Rock and Roll Restaurant."

In 1971, Kershaw had an acting and musical cameo in the Western film Zachariah, starring Don Johnson and John Rubinstein.

Kershaw's playing was featured in the Richard Brooks 1971 film Dollars.

In 1972, Kershaw played electric fiddle in Grand Funk's "Flight of the Phoenix" off their LP Phoenix. Capitol SMAS 11099

Later life 

Despite the success of his solo career, Kershaw was plagued by depression and sorrow. His father had committed suicide when he was only seven. Marrying his wife, Pam, at the Houston Astrodome on June 21, 1975, Kershaw began raising his own family that included five sons – Douglas, Victor, Zachary, Tyler, and Elijah; and two grandsons and a granddaughter. His son Tyler plays drums in his band, and manages his shows as well.

In 1978, Kershaw appeared briefly as a fiddler in the film Days of Heaven.

Kershaw rebounded with his biggest selling hit, "Hello Woman", which reached the country music Top 40. By 1984, Kershaw's battle with drug and alcohol abuse came to a close and his previously erratic behavior changed for the better.

In 1988, he recorded a duet, "Cajun Baby", with Hank Williams, Jr., that became a Top 50 country hit. Kershaw released a French-language album, Two Step Fever, in 1999, and Michael Doucet of Beausoleil is featured on the duet "Fievre De Deux Etapes". Hot Diggity Doug was released in mid-2000 and Still Cajun After All These Years followed in early 2001.  His brother Rusty died on October 23, 2001.

Kershaw formerly owned and operated The Bayou House, a restaurant in Lucerne, Colorado, but parted ways with his partners in 2007 due to his displeasure with management and ambiance.

In 2009, Doug was inducted into The Louisiana Music Hall of Fame.

Doug's third cousin is country music star Sammy Kershaw.

Discography

Albums 

{| class="wikitable"
|-
! rowspan="2"| Year
! rowspan="2"| Album
! colspan="3"| Chart Positions
! rowspan="2"| Label
|-
! style="width:50px;"| US Country
! style="width:50px;"| AUS
! style="width:50px;"| CAN
|-
| 1969
| The Cajun Way
| style="text-align:center;"| —
| style="text-align:center;"| —
| style="text-align:center;"| —
| rowspan="11"| Warner Bros.
|-
| 1970
| Spanish Moss
| style="text-align:center;"| —
| style="text-align:center;"| —
| style="text-align:center;"| 86
|-
| 1971
| Doug Kershaw
| style="text-align:center;"| —
| style="text-align:center;"| —
| style="text-align:center;"| —
|-
| rowspan=2| 1972
| Swamp Grass
| style="text-align:center;"| —
| style="text-align:center;"| —
| style="text-align:center;"| —
|-
| Devil's Elbow
| style="text-align:center;"| —
| style="text-align:center;"| —
| style="text-align:center;"| —
|-
| 1973
| Douglas James Kershaw
| style="text-align:center;"| —
| style="text-align:center;"| —
| style="text-align:center;"| —
|-
| 1974
| Mama Kershaw's Boy
| style="text-align:center;"| 14
| style="text-align:center;"| —
| style="text-align:center;"| —
|-
| 1975
| Alive & Pickin'''
| style="text-align:center;"| 32
| style="text-align:center;"| 95
| style="text-align:center;"| —
|-
| 1976
| Ragin' Cajun| style="text-align:center;"| 44
| style="text-align:center;"| —
| style="text-align:center;"| —
|-
| 1977
| Flip, Flop & Fly| style="text-align:center;"| 47
| style="text-align:center;"| —
| style="text-align:center;"| —
|-
| 1978
| The Louisiana Man| style="text-align:center;"| —
| style="text-align:center;"| —
| style="text-align:center;"| —
|-
| 1979
| Louisiana Cajun Country| style="text-align:center;"| —
| style="text-align:center;"| —
| style="text-align:center;"| —
| Starfire
|-
| 1981
| Instant Hero| style="text-align:center;"| —
| style="text-align:center;"| —
| style="text-align:center;"| —
| Scotti Bros.
|-
| rowspan=2| 1989
| Hot Diggidy Doug| style="text-align:center;"| —
| style="text-align:center;"| —
| style="text-align:center;"| —
| BGM
|-
| The Best of Doug Kershaw| style="text-align:center;"| —
| style="text-align:center;"| —
| style="text-align:center;"| —
| Warner Bros.
|}

 Singles 

 Notes 
1. This recording of "Louisiana Sun" dates from the 1960s, and likely features an uncredited Rusty Kershaw.
2. Promo copies exist with a re-recording of the song as "Don't Mess With My Popeye's", done specially for the fast food chain.

References

Relevant reading
Kershaw, Doug with Cathie Pelletier. 2019. The Ragin' Cajun: Memoir of a Louisiana Man.'' Macon, GA: Mercer University Press.

External links

 Official booking website
Doug Kershaw Interview NAMM Oral History Library (2021)

1936 births
Living people
20th-century American musicians
20th-century American singers
21st-century American singers
American country singer-songwriters
Grand Ole Opry members
People from Cameron Parish, Louisiana
McNeese State University alumni
United States Army soldiers
American folk musicians
Singer-songwriters from Louisiana
Cajun fiddlers
Country musicians from Louisiana
21st-century American violinists